Paul Ringer (born 28 January 1948) is an English-born former Welsh dual-code international rugby union and professional rugby league footballer. He played representative level rugby union for Wales and at club level for Ebbw Vale RFC, Llanelli RFC and Leicester, as a flanker.

International honours
Paul Ringer was born in Leeds. He earned his first rugby union cap for Wales against New Zealand, at Cardiff, in 1978 and was capped on total of 8 occasions. His final game was two years later in 1980, again at Cardiff against New Zealand. An abrasive and uncompromising forward, in a notorious international match between Wales and England at Twickenham in 1980 he was sent off for a challenge on English outside half John Horton controversially deemed as late by the referee. This controversy proved costly for Ringer as he was not selected for that summer's British Lions Tour to South Africa.

Paul Ringer won caps for Wales (RL) while at Cardiff City (Bridgend) Blue Dragons 1981...1982 2-caps.

Note
Before the start of the 1984/85 season, Cardiff City Blue Dragons relocated from Ninian Park in Cardiff, to Coychurch Road Ground in Bridgend, and were renamed Bridgend Blue Dragons.

Family history
Paul Ringer is the father of rugby union footballer of the 1990s, 2000s and 2010s; Jamie Ringer, and rugby union footballer; Joel Bennett Ringer.

References

1948 births
Living people
Cardiff City Blue Dragons players
Dual-code rugby internationals
Ebbw Vale RFC players
English people of Welsh descent
English rugby league players
English rugby union players
Leicester Tigers players
Llanelli RFC players
Rugby league locks
Rugby league players from Leeds
Rugby union flankers
Rugby union players from Leeds
Wales international rugby union players
Wales national rugby league team players